Amar Beganović (born 25 November 1999) is a Bosnian professional footballer who plays as a right-back for Slovenian PrvaLiga club Mura.

Beganović started his senior career with Sloboda Tuzla in 2017, before joining Mura in 2022.

Club career

Beganović came through youth academy of his hometown club Sloboda Tuzla, which he joined in 2005. He made his professional debut against Metalleghe-BSI on 4 March 2017 at the age of 17. On 22 September 2018, he scored his first goal in a 2–0 win over GOŠK Gabela.

In January 2022, he moved to Slovenian side Mura.

International career
Beganović represented Bosnia and Herzegovina at all youth levels.

Career statistics

Club

References

External links

1999 births
Living people
Sportspeople from Tuzla
Bosniaks of Bosnia and Herzegovina
Bosnia and Herzegovina Muslims
Bosnia and Herzegovina footballers
Bosnia and Herzegovina youth international footballers
Bosnia and Herzegovina under-21 international footballers
Bosnia and Herzegovina expatriate footballers
Association football fullbacks
FK Sloboda Tuzla players
NŠ Mura players
Premier League of Bosnia and Herzegovina players
Slovenian PrvaLiga players
Expatriate footballers in Slovenia
Bosnia and Herzegovina expatriate sportspeople in Slovenia